Dionisio Augustine II (born 16 June 1992) is a Micronesian Olympic swimmer. He represented his country at the 2016 Summer Olympics in the Men's 50 metre freestyle event where he ranked 65th with a time of 26.17 seconds. He did not advance to the semifinals.

References

External links
 

1992 births
Living people
People from Pohnpei State
Federated States of Micronesia male freestyle swimmers
Swimmers at the 2016 Summer Olympics
Olympic swimmers of the Federated States of Micronesia
Competitors at the 2013 Summer Universiade